Bridgwater was a parliamentary constituency  represented in the House of Commons of the Parliament of the United Kingdom, until 2010 when it was replaced by the Bridgwater and West Somerset constituency. It elected one Member of Parliament (MP) by the first past the post system of election.

History 
Bridgwater was one of the original Parliamentary Constituencies in the House of Commons, having elected Members of Parliament since 1295, the Model Parliament.

The original borough constituency was disenfranchised for corruption in 1870. From 4 July 1870 the town was incorporated within the county constituency of West Somerset.

From Parliament's enactment of the major Redistribution of Seats Act 1885 which took effect at the 1885 general election, a new county division of Bridgwater was created, which lasted with modifications until 2010.  The constituency expanded considerably beyond Bridgwater town itself from 1885.

Bridgwater frequently compared to other seats had a radical or game-changing representative, though since 1950 this became less noticeable in its candidates elected.

The seat received particular fame in late 1938 when a by-election took place in the aftermath of the signing of the Munich Agreement. Opponents of the agreement persuaded the local Labour and Liberal parties to not field candidates of their own against the Conservative candidate, but to instead jointly back an independent standing on a platform of opposition to the Government's foreign policy, in the hope that this would be the precursor to the formation of a more general Popular Front of opposition to the government of Neville Chamberlain in anticipation of the General Election due in either 1939 or 1940. The noted journalist Vernon Bartlett stood as the independent Popular Front candidate and achieved a sensational victory in what was hitherto a Conservative seat. He represented the constituency for the next twelve years.

In 1970 another by-election in the constituency achieved fame as it was the first occasion when 18-, 19- and 20-year-olds were able to vote in a UK Parliamentary election. The first teenager to cast a vote was Trudy Sellick, 18 on the day of the poll. The by-election was won by the future Conservative Cabinet Minister Tom King who held the seat for the next thirty-one years, followed by another Conservative until its abolition in 2010.

Boundaries 
1885–1918: The Municipal Borough of Bridgwater, the Sessional Division of Bridgwater, and parts of the Sessional Divisions of Taunton and Ilminster.

1918–1950: The Municipal Borough of Bridgwater, the Urban Districts of Burnham-on-Sea, Highbridge, Minehead, and Watchet, and the Rural Districts of Bridgwater and Williton.

1950–1983: The Municipal Borough of Bridgwater, the Urban Districts of Burnham-on-Sea, Minehead, and Watchet, and the Rural Districts of Bridgwater and Williton. Highbridge Urban District had been absorbed by Burnham-on-Sea UD in 1933, but the constituency boundaries remained unchanged.

1983–2010: The District of Sedgemoor wards of Cannington and Combwich, Central, Dowsborough, Eastern Quantocks, Eastover, East Poldens, Hamp, Huntspill, Newton Green, North Petherton, Parchey, Pawlett and Puriton, Quantock, Sandford, Sowey, Sydenham, Victoria, Westonzoyland, West Poldens, and Woolavington, and the District of West Somerset wards of Alcombe, Aville Vale, Carhampton and Withycombe, Crowcombe and Stogumber, Dunster, East Brendon, Holnicote, Minehead North, Minehead South, Old Cleeve, Porlock and Oare, Quantock Vale, Watchet, West Quantock, and Williton.

Members of Parliament 
Constituency created (1295)

Bridgwater borough, 1295–1870

MPs 1295–1640

1640–1868

Bridgwater county constituency, 1885–2010 
County division created (1885)

 Elections 
Elections in the 1830s

Elections in the 1840s

Elections in the 1850s

 Elections in the 1860s 

Westropp's election was declared void on petition on 25 April 1866, causing a by-election.

Patton was appointed Lord Advocate, requiring a by-election.

A Royal Commission found extensive bribery in the seat and, from 4 July 1870, the writ was suspended, both MPs were unseated, and the electorate was absorbed into West Somerset.

 Elections in the 1880s 

 Elections in the 1890s 

 Elections in the 1900s 

 Elections in the 1910s 

General Election 1914–15:

Another General Election was required to take place before the end of 1915. The political parties had been making preparations for an election to take place from 1914 and by the end of this year, the following candidates had been selected;
Unionist: Robert Sanders
Liberal: Philip Foale Rowsell

Sanders is appointed Treasurer of the Household, requiring him to seek re-election.

 Elections in the 1920s 

 Elections in the 1930s 

 Elections in the 1940s 
General Election 1939–40:

Another General Election was required to take place before the end of 1940. The political parties had been making preparations for an election to take place and by the Autumn of 1939, the following candidates had been selected;
Independent Progressive: Vernon Bartlett
Conservative: Patrick Heathcoat Amery

 Elections in the 1950s 

 Elections in the 1960s 

 Elections in the 1970s 

 Elections in the 1980s 

 Elections in the 1990s 

 Elections in the 2000s 

 See also 
List of parliamentary constituencies in Somerset

 Notes and references 

 Sources 
 Boundaries of Parliamentary Constituencies 1885–1972, compiled and edited by F.W.S. Craig (Parliamentary Reference Publications 1972)
 British Parliamentary Election Results 1832–1885, compiled and edited by F.W.S. Craig (Macmillan Press 1977)
 British Parliamentary Election Results 1885–1918, compiled and edited by F.W.S. Craig (Macmillan Press 1974)
 British Parliamentary Election Results 1918–1949, compiled and edited by F.W.S. Craig (Macmillan Press, revised edition 1977)
 British Parliamentary Election Results 1950–1973, compiled and edited by F.W.S. Craig (Parliamentary Research Services 1983)
 Who's Who of British Members of Parliament: Volume I 1832–1885, edited by M. Stenton (The Harvester Press 1976)
 Who's Who of British Members of Parliament, Volume II 1886–1918, edited by M. Stenton and S. Lees (Harvester Press 1978)
 Who's Who of British Members of Parliament, Volume III 1919–1945, edited by M. Stenton and S. Lees (Harvester Press 1979)
 Who's Who of British Members of Parliament, Volume IV 1945–1979, edited by M. Stenton and S. Lees (Harvester Press 1981)
 Robert Beatson, A Chronological Register of Both Houses of Parliament (London: Longman, Hurst, Res & Orme, 1807) 
 D Brunton & D H Pennington, Members of the Long Parliament (London: George Allen & Unwin, 1954)Cobbett's Parliamentary history of England, from the Norman Conquest in 1066 to the year 1803 (London: Thomas Hansard, 1808) 
 Esther S Cope and Willson H Coates (eds), Camden Fourth Series, Volume 19: Proceedings of the Short Parliament of 1640 (London: Royal Historical Society, 1977)
 Maija Jansson (ed.), Proceedings in Parliament, 1614 (House of Commons) (Philadelphia: American Philosophical Society, 1988) 
 J E Neale, The Elizabethan House of Commons'' (London: Jonathan Cape, 1949)
 'Bridgwater: Parliamentary representation' in Victoria County History of Somerset: Volume 6 (1992)

Parliamentary constituencies in Somerset (historic)
Constituencies of the Parliament of the United Kingdom established in 1295
Constituencies of the Parliament of the United Kingdom disestablished in 1870
Constituencies of the Parliament of the United Kingdom established in 1885
Constituencies of the Parliament of the United Kingdom disestablished in 2010
Parliamentary constituencies disenfranchised for corruption
Bridgwater